Two (also referred to as epTwo) is the second EP release by British alternative rock band Hundred Reasons. Released on August 6, 2001, the EP was their first on Columbia Records after signing to the label.

It features live favourite "Remmus" and two other songs - "Soapbox rally" and the original version of "Shine". "Shine" would later appear on their debut album Ideas Above Our Station. The CD also features the video for "Remmus".

Track listing
 "Remmus"
 "Soapbox Rally"
 "Shine"

7" single
 "Remmus"
 "Soapbox Rally"

References

2001 EPs
Hundred Reasons albums